Slovenia is a country in southeastern Europe.

Slovenia  may also refer to:
 Slovenia (European Parliament constituency)
 United Slovenia, projected (1848) political entity 
 Socialist Republic of Slovenia, a federal unit of former Yugoslavia
 Eastern Slovenia, one of the two statistical regions of Slovenia
 Western Slovenia, the other of two statistical regions of Slovenia
 Friulian Slovenia, region in northeastern Italy (Beneška Slovenija)

See also
 Slovenians (disambiguation)
 Slovene (disambiguation)
 Slavonia (disambiguation)
 Slavia (disambiguation)